Chester Friends Meetinghouse is a Quaker meeting house at 520 East 24th Street in Chester, Delaware County, Pennsylvania, United States.

The first recorded meeting of Friends in the province of Pennsylvania was in Chester at the house of Robert Wade in 1675.  William Edmundson, the founder of Quakerism in Ireland was present at the first meeting.

In 1682, the Chester Friends agreed to hold their meeting at the Chester Court House, also known at the time as the House of Defense.

On January 7, 1687, a lot was purchased on the west side of present-day Edgemont Avenue and construction began on the meetinghouse.

The first Chester Friends Meetinghouse was completed in 1693.

William Penn was known to speak at the original Chester Friends meetinghouse.

In 1735, after forty-three years of worship at the original building, a larger meetinghouse was built on the same property.

The existing buildings have 1829 and 1954 represented on them indicating the date of construction of the current buildings.

The Chester Friends meetinghouse is an active worship center.

Notable burials
John Chew Thomas (1764-1836) - U.S. Congressman from Maryland

References

1675 establishments in Pennsylvania
19th-century Quaker meeting houses
Cemeteries in Delaware County, Pennsylvania
Chester, Pennsylvania
Churches completed in 1829
Churches in Delaware County, Pennsylvania
Quaker meeting houses in Pennsylvania